Yves Mubama Kibwey (born 9 June 1970) is a DR Congolese former professional footballer who played as a striker.

Club career
Kibwey was born in Kinshasa, DR Congo. He played with Red Star 93 of France in the Ligue 2 from 1993 to 1994.

After Red Star he moved to three other clubs in France and then moved to Portuguese club Académica. Académica was in Liga 2 at that time and with 12 goals he helped them progress to the top division of Portuguese football.

He then moved to Saudi Arabian club Al-Shoalah which was in Saudi First Division at the time.

He ended his career with a return to Châtellerault.

International career
Kibwey made his professional debut for The Leopards on 27 January 2000, in the 2000 African Cup of Nations against the Bafana Boys in Group B losing 1–0 from a 44th-minute goal from Shaun Bartlett.

References

External links
International Profile at 11v11.com

1970 births
Living people
Footballers from Kinshasa
Democratic Republic of the Congo footballers
Association football forwards
Primeira Liga players
ES Viry-Châtillon players
AS Muret players
Associação Académica de Coimbra – O.A.F. players
U.D. Leiria players
Al-Shoulla FC players
Democratic Republic of the Congo international footballers
2000 African Cup of Nations players
Democratic Republic of the Congo expatriate footballers
Democratic Republic of the Congo expatriate sportspeople in France
Democratic Republic of the Congo expatriate sportspeople in Portugal
Expatriate footballers in France
Expatriate footballers in Portugal
Expatriate footballers in Saudi Arabia